
Stephen Matthew Barr (born November 28, 1953) is an American physicist who is a professor emeritus of physics at the University of Delaware. A member of its Bartol Research Institute, Barr does research in theoretical particle physics and cosmology. In 2011, he was elected Fellow of the American Physical Society, the citation reading "for original contributions to grand unified theories, CP violation, and baryogenesis."

Career 
His notable work includes co-discovering the much studied flipped SU(5) scheme of unification, identifying the Barr–Zee diagram as an important source of electric dipole moment for basic particles such as the electron and neutron in many theories, and proposing the so-called Nelson–Barr mechanism as a solution to the strong CP problem. He is the author of the article on "Grand Unified Theories" for the Encyclopedia of Physics.

Barr received his PhD in theoretical particle physics from Princeton University in 1978. Princeton awarded him the Charlotte Elizabeth Proctor Fellowship "for distinguished research." He went on to do research at the University of Pennsylvania as a post-doctoral fellow (1978–80), the University of Washington as a research assistant professor (1980–85), and Brookhaven National Laboratory as an associate scientist (1985–87), before joining the faculty of the University of Delaware in 1987. He was elected director of the Bartol Research Institute of the University of Delaware in 2011.

Barr, a practicing Catholic, writes and lectures frequently on the relation of science and religion. Since 2000 he has served on the editorial advisory board (now the advisory council) of the ecumenical religious intellectual journal First Things, in which many of his articles and book reviews have appeared since 1995. His writing has also appeared in Commonweal, National Review, Modern Age, The Public Interest, America, The Wall Street Journal, and other publications. In 2002 he gave the Erasmus Lecture, sponsored by the Institute on Religion and Public Life. In 2007 he was awarded the Benemerenti Medal by Pope Benedict XVI. In 2010 he was elected a member of the Academy of Catholic Theology. He is also president of the Society of Catholic Scientists.

Personal life 
He is married to Kathleen Whitney Barr. They have five children.

Barr is the younger brother of William Barr, the 77th and 85th Attorney General of the United States, and the son of Donald Barr, an educator who served as headmaster of Dalton School and Hackley School. He graduated from Columbia College in 1974.

Publications
 Stephen M. Barr, (2006) Modern Physics and Ancient Faith. University of Notre Dame Press. .
 Stephen M. Barr, (2006) A Student's Guide to Natural Science. ISI Press. 
 Stephen M. Barr, (2011) Science and Religion: The Myth of Conflict (Explanations). Catholic Truth Society.  
 Stephen M. Barr, (2016) The Believing Scientist: Essays on Science and Religion.  Description & arrow/scrollable preview. Eerdmans.

See also 
 List of science and religion scholars

References

External links
 
 
 University of Delaware faculty page

21st-century American physicists
University of Delaware faculty
Particle physicists
Princeton University alumni
University of Pennsylvania faculty
University of Washington faculty
Living people
1953 births
Writers about religion and science
American people of Jewish descent
American Roman Catholics
Recipients of the Benemerenti medal
Columbia College (New York) alumni
Fellows of the American Physical Society